Tancred is a 1980 fantasy role-playing game adventure published by Judges Guild for Traveller.

Plot summary
Tancred is an adventure that takes place on the planet Tancred in the Outreamer subsector of the Imperium, which is owned and exploited by its nobility and is in the throes of rebellion.

Publication history
Tancred was written by Dave Sering and was published in 1980 by Judges Guild as a 48-page book.

Reception
William A. Barton reviewed Tancred in The Space Gamer No. 35. Barton commented that "most role-players probably won't be all that concerned with proofreading errors [...] and so should find Tancred near the top of all the Traveller adventures currently available."

References

Judges Guild publications
Role-playing game supplements introduced in 1980
Traveller (role-playing game) adventures